James R. Fortune Jr. (born October 20, 1944) is an American politician. He served as a Democratic member for the 71-1 district of the Georgia House of Representatives.

Life and career 
Fortune was born in Fulton County, Georgia. He attended the University of Georgia and served in the United States Army.

In 1979, Fortune was elected to represent the 71-1 district of the Georgia House of Representatives, succeeding John R. Carlisle.

References 

1944 births
Living people
People from Floyd County, Georgia
Democratic Party members of the Georgia House of Representatives
20th-century American politicians
University of Georgia alumni